The S30 is a regional railway line of the Zürich S-Bahn on the ZVV (Zürich transportation network). It connects the cantons of Zürich and Thurgau, Switzerland, with some services extending to the canton of St. Gallen.

Route 
 

The line runs from Winterthur, canton of Zürich, via Frauenfeld, canton of Thurgau, to Weinfelden, also in Thurgau.

Some services also extend to Romanshorn, Thurgau, and Rorschach, in the canton of St. Gallen.

Stations

 Winterthur Hauptbahnhof
 Oberwinterthur
 Wiesendangen (ZH)
 Rickenbach-Attikon
 Islikon
 Frauenfeld
 Felben-Wellhausen
 Hüttlingen-Mettendorf
 Müllheim-Wigoltingen
 Märstetten
 Weinfelden (TG)

Rolling stock 
All services are operated by THURBO rolling stock.

Scheduling 
The train frequency is usually one every 60 minutes.

See also 

 Rail transport in Switzerland
 Trams in Zürich

References 

 ZVV official website: Routes & zones

Zürich S-Bahn lines
Transport in the canton of St. Gallen
Transport in the canton of Zürich
Transport in Thurgau